William Freville (c. 1396 – 1460), of Little Shelford, Cambridgeshire, was an English politician.

He was a Member (MP) of the Parliament of England for Cambridgeshire in May 1421.

References

1396 births
1460 deaths
English MPs May 1421
People from Little Shelford